Ennoeitai (Greek: Εννοείται; English: It's Understood) is the sixth studio album by popular Greek singer Nikos Oikonomopoulos. It was released on 14 December 2012 by Minos EMI. The songs "Ennoeitai" and "Ora Na Pigaino" were the most populars, with music composed by Panos Kapiris and written lyrics by Eleni Giannatsoulia.

Track listing
"Ennoeitai" (Εννοείται; It’s Understood ) - 3:08
"Poso Na Poneso" (Πόσο Να Πονέσω; How To Suffer) – 3:00
"Afto To Soma" (Αυτό Το Σώμα; This Body) - 3:55
"Melanholia Mou" (Μελαγχολία Μου; My Melancholy) - 4:08
"Isihia" (Ησυχία; Quiet) - 2:50
"Ego O Dinatos" (Εγώ Ο Δυνατός; I The Strong) - 3:11
"Me Poio Dikaioma" (Με Ποιο Δικαίωμα; By What Right) - 2:44
"Stasou" (Στάσου; Stop) - 3:20
"Ora Na Pigaino" (Ώρα Να Πηγαίνω; Time To Go) - 3:47
"O Kaliteros Ehthros Mou" (Ο Καλύτερος Εχθρός Μου; My Best Enemy) - 3:20
"Ti Thimasai" (Τι Θυμάσαι; What Do You Remember) - 2:57
"Afou Horisame" (Αφού Χωρίσαμε; After We're Broken up) - 2:57
"Tripa Stin Kardia" (Τρύπα Στην Καρδιά; Hole In Heart) - 3:44
"Pos Allazoun Oi Kardies" (Πως Αλλάζουν Οι Καρδιές; How Change Hearts) - 3:15

Chart performance 
The album was certified double platinum on 19 July 2013. On 15 December was certified four times platinum.

References

2012 albums
Nikos Oikonomopoulos albums
Minos EMI albums
Greek-language albums